Events in the year 2018 in Ecuador.

Incumbents
President: Lenín Moreno
Vice President: Jorge Glas (until 3 January); María Alejandra Vicuña (from 3 January until 4 December); Otto Sonnenholzner (from 11 December)

Events 
4 February – the Ecuadorian referendum and popular consultation, 2018

Sports
9 to 25 February – Ecuador participated at the 2018 Winter Olympics in PyeongChang, South Korea

Deaths

26 January – José Gabriel Diaz Cueva, Roman Catholic bishop (b. 1925).

22 February – Euler Granda, poet and psychiatrist (b. 1935)

19 March – Nicolás Kingman Riofrío, journalist, writer and politician (b. 1918)

19 June – Ángel Medardo Luzuriaga, musician (b. 1935).

References

 
2010s in Ecuador
Years of the 21st century in Ecuador
Ecuador
Ecuador